Lunkuni Airport  is an airstrip serving the village of Lunkuni in Kwilu Province, Democratic Republic of the Congo.

See also

Transport in the Democratic Republic of the Congo
List of airports in the Democratic Republic of the Congo

References

External links
 FallingRain - Lunkuni Airport
 Google Maps/2013 - Lunkuni
 OpenStreetMap - Lunkuni

Airports in Kwilu Province